Mandi Mullanpur, also known as Mullanpur, is a town located 18 km from Ludhiana on Grand Trunk Road to Jagraon. The village of Mullanpur is connected to the town of Mandi-Mullanpur via two link roads. On one road there is a Gurudwara (Sikh temple), Mashkiana Sahib (sometimes called Mushkiana Sahib or Baba Saheedan), having historical significance. On the other road there are houses of families who have lived there since Independence [Circa 1950].

Inhabitants 
Most of the people living there are farmers and businessmen.
The population of Mandi Mullanpur is mainly of India's four main religious groups: Sikhs, Hindus, Muslims, and Christians. Males constitute 53% of the population and females 47%. Mandi Mullanpur has an average literacy rate of 69%, higher than the national average of 59.5%: male literacy is 74%, and female literacy is 63%. In Mandi Mullanpur, 11% of the population is under 6 years of age.

References

Cities and towns in Ludhiana district